Eḷu, also Hela or Helu, is a Middle Indo-Aryan language or Prakrit of the 3rd century BCE. It is ancestral to the Sinhalese and Dhivehi languages.  
R. C. Childers, in the Journal of the Royal Asiatic Society, states: 
The Pali scholar Thomas William Rhys Davids refers to Eḷu as "the Prakrit of Ceylon".

The Hela Havula are a modern Sri Lankan literary organization that advocate the use of Eḷu terms over Sanskritisms. Eḷu is often referred to by modern Sinhalese as amisra, Sanskrit and Sinhalese term for "unmixed".

A feature of Eḷu is its preference for short vowels, loss of aspiration and the reduction of compound consonants found frequently in other Prakrits such as Pali.

Eḷu in comparison with Pali and Sanskrit
Being a Prakrit, Eḷu is closely related to other Prakrits such as Pali. Indeed, a very large proportion of Eḷu word-stems are identical in form to Pali. The connections were sufficiently well known that technical terms from Pali and Sanskrit were easily converted into Eḷu by a set of conventional phonological transformations. Because of the prevalence of these transformations, it is not always possible to tell whether a given Eḷu word is a part of the old Prakrit lexicon, or a transformed borrowing from Sanskrit.

Vowels and diphthongs
Sanskrit ai and au always monophthongize to Eḷu e and o, respectively
Examples: maitrī → met, auṣadha → osada
Sanskrit avi becomes Eḷu e (i.e. avi → ai → e)
Example: sthavira → thera

Sound changes
 Initial ca in Sanskrit and Pali becomes s or h
Examples: canda → sanda, handa
  P if not omitted becomes v
Examples: rūpa → ruva, dīpa → diva
 The Sanskrit sibilants ś, ṣ, and s merge as Eḷu s
Examples: śaraṇa → saraṇa, doṣa → dosa
 The Sanskrit  kti becomes ti or vi
Examples: bhakti → bätiya, shakti → saviya

Compound consonants

At the beginning of a word only a single consonant can remain
Examples: dharma → dahama
Examples: prāna → pana

In the middle of a word no group may exceed one consonant
Examples: artha → aruta
Examples: danta → data

List of Elu words with their Sanskrit and Pali equivalents

References

See also
Linguistic history of the Indian subcontinent

Southern Indo-Aryan languages
Sinhala language
Languages of Sri Lanka
Prakrit languages
Languages attested from the 3rd century BC